German submarine U-756 was a Type VIIC U-boat built for Nazi Germany's Kriegsmarine for service during World War II. Laid down as yard number 139 at the Kriegsmarinewerft (KMW) in Wilhelmshaven, she served with 6th U-boat flotilla from 30 December 1941 until 1 September 1942 under the command of Kapitänleutnant Klaus Harney. U-756 did not survive to complete her first patrol and did not sink or damage any ships.

Design
German Type VIIC submarines were preceded by the shorter Type VIIB submarines. U-756 had a displacement of  when at the surface and  while submerged. She had two shafts and two  propellers.

U-756 was fitted with five  torpedo tubes (four fitted at the bow and one at the stern), fourteen torpedoes, one  SK C/35 naval gun, 220 rounds, and a  C/30 anti-aircraft gun. The boat had a complement of between forty-four and sixty.

Fate

Eighteen days into her first patrol, on 1 September 1942 U-756 was in position  in the mid North-Atlantic when she was attacked by the Canadian corvette . Heavily damaged, the vessel went down with all 43 aboard.

References

Bibliography

External links

U-756 crew list

German Type VIIC submarines
U-boats commissioned in 1941
U-boats sunk in 1942
World War II submarines of Germany
World War II shipwrecks in the Atlantic Ocean
1941 ships
Ships built in Wilhelmshaven
U-boats sunk by depth charges
U-boats sunk by Canadian warships
Ships lost with all hands
Maritime incidents in September 1942